Kunri railway station 
(Sindhi:  ڪنري ريلوي اسٽيشن) is  a railway station located in  Pakistan.

See also
 List of railway stations in Pakistan
 Pakistan Railways

References

External links

Railway stations in Umerkot District